Peeter Schütz (born 29 June 1877 Hummuli Parish (now Tõrva Parish), Kreis Fellin) was an Estonian politician. He was a member of II Riigikogu. He was a member of the Riigikogu since 24 December 1923. He replaced Anton Palvadre.

References

1877 births
Year of death missing
People from Tõrva Parish
People from Kreis Fellin
Estonian Social Democratic Workers' Party politicians
Estonian Socialist Workers' Party politicians
Members of the Riigikogu, 1923–1926
Members of the Riigikogu, 1926–1929
Members of the Riigikogu, 1929–1932
Members of the Riigikogu, 1932–1934